Anechura bipunctata is a species of earwig in the family Forficulidae.

Distribution
This species is present in most of Europe.

Habitat
This montane species can be found at highest elevations, over 2000 meters above sea level.

Description
This characteristic winged species shows a black body with a yellow marking on the elytrae. Head, legs and sides of pronotum are yellowish orange. Antennae have 9-12 segments. Pronotum is wider than long. In the males the cerci are double curved. Larvae are black.

References

External links
 
 
 Natura Mediterraneo
 Entomofauna Saxonica
 Earwigs on line

 
Insects described in 1781
Taxa named by Johan Christian Fabricius